Antipodophlebia is a genus of dragonflies in the family Telephlebiidae,
There is only one species of this genus which is endemic to south-eastern Australia.

Species
The genus includes one species:

 Antipodophlebia asthenes  - Terrestrial evening darner

See also
 List of Odonata species of Australia

References

Telephlebiidae
Anisoptera genera
Monotypic Odonata genera
Odonata of Australia
Endemic fauna of Australia
Taxa named by Frederic Charles Fraser
Insects described in 1960